The 4th Secretariat of the Lao People's Revolutionary Party (LPRP), officially the Secretariat of the 4th National Congress of the Lao People's Revolutionary Party, was elected at the 1st Plenary Session of the 4th Central Committee in 1986.

Members

References

Specific

Bibliography
Articles:
 

4th Secretariat of the Lao People's Revolutionary Party
1986 establishments in Laos
1991 disestablishments in Laos